Terminological inexactitude is a phrase introduced in 1906 by British politician Winston Churchill. It is used as a euphemism or circumlocution meaning a lie, an untruth, or a substantially correct but technically inaccurate statement.

Churchill first used the phrase following the 1906 election. Speaking in the House of Commons on 22 February 1906 as Under-Secretary of the Colonial Office, he had occasion to repeat what he had said during the campaign. When asked that day whether the Government was condoning slavery of Chinese labourers in the Transvaal, Churchill replied:

It has been used as a euphemism for a lie in the House of Commons, as to accuse another member of lying would be considered unparliamentary.

In more recent times, the term was used by Conservative MP Jacob Rees-Mogg to the Leader of the Opposition, Jeremy Corbyn over an accusation that Rees-Mogg's company had moved a hedge fund into the Eurozone despite his being in favour of Brexit.

See also

 Economical with the truth
 Alternative facts
Fake news

References

Further reading

 Rees, Nigel (ed.) (1984). Sayings of the Century. London : Allen & Unwin. 
 Plato, The Laws (ca. 350 BC) Book 9

English phrases
Euphemisms
Winston Churchill
Political concepts
Politics of the United Kingdom
Lying